Jerry Stevenson may refer to:

 Jerry Stevenson (musician)
 Jerry Stevenson (politician)